The 2006 European Karate Championships, the 41st edition, were held in Stavanger, Norway from 5 to 7 May 2006.

Medallists

Men's competition

Individual

Team

Women's competition

Individual

Team

Medal table

References

2006
Karate
European Karate Championships
European championships in 2006
Sport in Stavanger
Karate competitions in Norway
May 2006 sports events in Europe